The group stage of the 2007 Sudirman Cup was the first stage of the competition. It was held at Scotstoun Stadium in Glasgow, Scotland, from 11 to 14 June.

Group composition

Level 1

Group A

China vs. Thailand

Malaysia vs. England

Malaysia vs. Thailand

China vs. England

China vs. Malaysia

England vs. Thailand

Group B

Denmark vs. Hong Kong

South Korea vs. Indonesia

Denmark vs. Indonesia

South Korea vs. Hong Kong

Indonesia vs. Hong Kong

Denmark vs. South Korea

Level 2

Group A

Singapore vs. Sweden

Germany vs. Chinese Taipei

Singapore vs. Chinese Taipei

Germany vs. Sweden

Singapore vs. Germany

Chinese Taipei vs. Sweden

Group B

Japan vs. Netherlands

Poland vs. Russia

Japan vs. Russia

Poland vs. Netherlands

Russia vs. Netherlands

Japan vs. Poland

Level 3

Group A

Canada vs. United States

France vs. Ukraine

France vs. United States

Canada vs. Ukraine

France vs. Canada

United States vs. Ukraine

Group B

Scotland vs. New Zealand

India vs. Finland

Scotland vs. Finland

India vs. New Zealand

India vs. Scotland

New Zealand vs. Finland

Level 4

Group A

Australia vs. Wales

Spain vs. Italy

Australia vs. Italy

Spain vs. Wales

Australia vs. Spain

Italy vs. Wales

Group B

Bulgaria vs. Estonia

Czech Republic vs. Switzerland

Czech Republic vs. Estonia

Bulgaria vs. Switzerland

Bulgaria vs. Czech Republic

Switzerland vs. Estonia

Level 5

Group A

Slovenia vs. Luxembourg

Lithuania vs. South Africa

Slovenia vs. South Africa

Lithuania vs. Luxembourg

South Africa vs. Luxembourg

Slovenia vs. Lithuania

Group B

Ireland vs. Norway

Peru vs. Sri Lanka

Ireland vs. Sri Lanka

Peru vs. Norway

Sri Lanka vs. Norway

Ireland vs. Peru

Level 6

Group A

Portugal vs. Latvia

Slovakia vs. Turkey

Portugal vs. Turkey

Slovakia vs. Latvia

Portugal vs. Slovakia

Turkey vs. Latvia

Group B

Belgium vs. Belarus

Iceland vs. Cyprus

Belgium vs. Cyprus

Iceland vs. Belarus

Belgium vs. Iceland

Cyprus vs. Belarus

References

External links 
 

Sudirman Cup
2007 Sudirman Cup
Sudirman Cup group stage